Acacia furcatispina is a species of plant in the family Fabaceae. It is found in Argentina, Bolivia, and Paraguay.

References

 

furcatispina
Least concern plants
Taxonomy articles created by Polbot
Taxobox binomials not recognized by IUCN